Waqar Younis, a retired Pakistani cricketer, took 35 five-wicket hauls during his career in international cricket. In cricket, a five-wicket haul (also known as a "five–for" or "fifer") refers to a bowler taking five or more wickets in a single innings. This is regarded as a notable achievement, and only 41 bowlers have taken at least 15 five-wicket hauls at international level in their cricketing careers. A right-arm fast bowler who represented his country between 1989 and 2003, the BBC described Waqar as "one of the most feared fast bowlers in recent cricketing history", while former Pakistan captain Imran Khan said that Waqar was "a thinking cricketer and, at his peak, he was the most destructive bowler the game had seen". The cricket almanack Wisden noted his "pace and swing", and named him one of their Cricketers of the Year in 1992. Waqar was inducted into the ICC Hall of Fame on 9 December 2013.

Waqar made his Test debut in 1989 against India in Karachi, where he took four wickets in the first innings. His first Test five-wicket haul came the following year against New Zealand in a match which Pakistan won at Gaddafi Stadium, Lahore. He took a pair of five-wicket hauls in a single match against Zimbabwe at the Defence Stadium, Karachi in December 1993. His career-best figures for an innings were 7 wickets for 76 runs against New Zealand at Iqbal Stadium, Faisalabad, in October 1990. He went on to take ten or more wickets per match on five occasions.

Making his One Day International (ODI) debut in October 1989 against West Indies at the Sharjah Cricket Association Stadium (Sharjah), Waqar's first ODI five-wicket haul came the following year against Sri Lanka in a match which Pakistan won at the Sharjah. He achieved a hat-trick (three wickets in consecutive deliveries), against New Zealand in 1994. His career-best bowling in ODI cricket was 7 wickets for 36 runs, against England at Headingley in June 2001. He took three consecutive five-wicket hauls in ODI matches in November 1990. Retiring from international cricket in 2003 after nearly 14 years, Waqar took 22 five-wicket hauls in Test cricket and 13 in ODIs. As of November 2020, he is joint sixth (with Rangana Herath) overall among all-time combined five-wicket haul takers, and top of the equivalent ODI list.

Key

Tests

One Day Internationals

References

External links
 
 

Younis
Younis, Waqar